Camille, also known as The Woman in the Green Dress, is an 1866 oil-on-canvas painting by French artist Claude Monet. The portrait shows Monet's future wife, Camille Doncieux, wearing a green dress and jacket. Monet submitted the work to the Paris Salon of 1866, where it was well received by critics. The painting is held in the collection of the Kunsthalle Bremen.

Description 
Camille in the Green Dress is a life size portrait. Camille wears a green and black striped silk dress over a black jacket trimmed with fur. The dress in emerald green corresponded to the fashion of the time with the contrasting vertical stripes. Yellow leather gloves and a dark capote decorated with feathers serve as accessories. Camille wears her hair in a bun tied with black ribbons at the nape of her neck. The background of the picture is a dark red, almost black curtain.

Through the composition of the image, Monet succeeded in conveying movement. The train of the dress has been cut off at the left edge of the picture, causing a movement in this direction that goes beyond the edge of the picture. Liveliness is also created by the play of the folds in the skirt. The slightly backward-turned position of the head represents a moment of pause in the picture. The figure seems to be listening to itself rather than reacting to someone speaking to it. This is achieved through the downcast eyes and thereby avoiding eye contact with the viewer. The painting is signed lower right Claude Monet 1866.

The lighting of the this picture unique in that it is diffused and the origin of it is obscure. We see kind of  a semi circle of light surrounding Camille on the floor and source is particularly highlighting her face, hand and skirt. Light is probably coming from a window since it is too natural looking to be produced by candles or gas lamps.  The placement of the window is hard to tell but it’s probably to the left and in front of her as her shadow is cast to the right but her face and skirt are still highlighted.

References

Further reading
 Hansen, Dorothee (2005). Monet und "Camille": Frauenportraits im Impressionismus. Ed. Dorothee Hansen and Wulf Herzogenrath. Exh. cat., Kunsthalle Bremen. Munich.

External links
 Camille at the Kunsthalle Bremen

Paintings by Claude Monet
1866 paintings